Libres como el viento (English title: Free as the wind) is a Venezuelan telenovela developed by Pilar Romero and produced by Radio Caracas Television in 2009. The series was inspired by the novel Una Brizna de paja en el viento written by Rómulo Gallegos in 1952. The story was based on the context of student protests that took place in the country during that year.

Laura Chimaras and Jonathan Montenegro starred as the protagonists with Guillermo Pérez, Juliet Lima and Damián Genovese as the antagonists.

Plot
Libres como el viento is a love story marked by university news and pragmatic news of students.

Fabiola Azcárate, the youngest of five siblings, is sent abroad to continue her studies after her father's death. But nostalgia will force her to return to her country without knowing that the love of her childhood is waiting for her. Upon arrival, "La Muñeca", as her relatives call her, will find out that the brothers are divided because they do not know what to do with the inheritance that their father left them: abandon the family business or defend it until the end. The dilemma will mark the beginning of family discord.

For his part, Miguel Angel Marino "El Potro", son of the Hacienda Azcárate foreman, has become an adult man who has not forgotten Fabiola. But Tibisay Pacheco "La China", a sensual woman, is ready to do everything to conquer the love of Michelangelo.

The relationship of "La Muñeca" and "El Potro" will be a relationship marked by the impetus of youth and the craving for freedom, which will be strengthened at the Nicolas Copernicus University, whose classrooms are divided by two sides faced by the control of the college. One of the sides is directed by Diego Bravo, who seeks division and confrontation, and the other, whose leader is Reinaldo Torres, tries to consolidate the union of students in the university community.

Along with the students, will be Professor Rogelio Luciente, who more than a man of letters, will become the consciousness of the student movement; And Professor Ivana Galvan, who will be her right hand in this cause. Together they will be a vivid example of how powerful the wings of love can be, uniting opposing worlds into one reality.

Cast

References

External links

2009 telenovelas
2009 Venezuelan television series debuts
2010 Venezuelan television series endings
Venezuelan telenovelas
RCTV telenovelas
Spanish-language telenovelas
Television shows set in Caracas